Midnight in the Patch: Tribute to the Smashing Pumpkins is a 2001 tribute album, featuring a variety of artists covering songs from the American alternative rock band Smashing Pumpkins.

Track listing

2001 compilation albums
The Smashing Pumpkins tribute albums
Vitamin Records compilation albums